TimeSTAMP (Time – Specific Tag for the Age Measurement of Proteins) is a technique invented by Michael Z. Lin at the Roger Tsien lab at the University of California, San Diego in 2008. It is a technique that can specifically label the newly synthesized copies of the genetically tagged protein.

Principle of the TimeSTAMP technique
The TimeSTAMP technique for labelling newly synthesized proteins of interest and is based on drug–dependent preservation of epitope tags

A simple diagram showing the strategy for drug–dependent epitope tagging of newly synthesized proteins can be found here: .

In this technique, a tag that is present on all the proteins that are synthesized after the one-time administration of a small molecule drug. To achieve this goal, specific protease activity is incorporated to confer self–removing behaviour onto an epitope tag. Then, a corresponding protease inhibitor is used in order to block the removal of the tag. As a result, only those proteins synthesized after the application of inhibitor would be tagged.

A subsequent variant of TimeSTAMP allows for drug-dependent preservation of fluorescent protein tags.

Application of TimeSTAMP technique
As TimeSTAMP technique can achieve temporally controlled labelling of newly synthesized proteins of interest even in thick tissues or intact animals and provide a sensitive, specific detection, the distribution of newly synthesized protein in a living animal can be studied

References

External links
 Tsien Lab website

Protein methods